John Robbins Sanborn (1839 – January 13, 1914) was a farmer and political figure in Quebec. He represented Shefford from 1891 to 1896 as a Liberal member.

He was born in South Roxton, Lower Canada, the son of A. Sanborn who came to Lower Canada from New Hampshire, and was educated in Granby. He married Malvina Blampin. Sanborn served on the council for South Roxton. He was also a school commissioner, president of the Agricultural Society, vice-president of the Dairy Association and a director of the Fruit Grower's Association.

References 
 
The Canadian parliamentary companion, 1891, AJ Gemmill

1839 births
1914 deaths
People from Montérégie
Members of the House of Commons of Canada from Quebec
Liberal Party of Canada MPs
Canadian people of American descent
Anglophone Quebec people